Mi Zhu ( 165–221), courtesy name Zizhong, was a Chinese military general and politician who served under the warlord Liu Bei in the late Eastern Han dynasty, during the Three Kingdoms period, after Liu Bei founded the state of Shu Han. He was also Liu Bei's brother-in-law, as his sister, Lady Mi, married Liu Bei. Mi Zhu was essential to Liu Bei during the defeats of the latter, financing Liu Bei's army in critical times where there was no tax base. Mi Zhu was extremely well educated and helped Liu Bei develop relationships with wealthy rivals such as Yuan Shao, Yuan Shu and Liu Biao. He was also the elder brother of Mi Fang, who served Liu Bei as well until his defection to Liu Bei's ally-turned-rival Sun Quan in 220. Mi Zhu served Liu Bei loyally for more than 25 years, as a high civil official of Liu during all the later's tenures as governor of Xu, Jing and Yi provinces, the former's ideas were regularly and widely circulated to the common people which greatly helped Liu Bei's political movement as Han loyalist and Confucian but, historians would argue it mere rhetoric as Liu ruled more in the tradition of legalism. Nonetheless, Mi along with Jian Yong, Sun Qian, and later Yi Ji, greatly contributed to the Liu's populist movement to restore the Han dynasty through literature and essays. Mi Zhu was thought to be Liu's best friend and most favored subject, he died of illness a little over a year after Liu Bei declared himself emperor.

Life
Mi Zhu was from Qu County, Donghai Commandery, which is present-day Lianyungang, Jiangsu. He was born in an extremely rich merchant family. According to In Search of the Supernatural by Gan Bao, a work largely consisting of legends and hearsays, Mi Zhu was once returning home from the capital Luoyang when he met a lady by the road. He gave her a lift out of kindness. When she alighted, she revealed that she was an emissary from Heaven on a mission to burn down Mi Zhu's house. However, to repay his kindness, she agreed to walk slowly so as to allow Mi Zhu the time to evacuate the house. A huge fire indeed broke out at noon as the lady promised.

Legends aside, Mi Zhu initially served under Tao Qian, the governor of Xu Province (present-day northern Jiangsu). Upon his death, Tao Qian told to Mi Zhu that he believed Liu Bei to be the only person able to bring peace back to the province of Xu therefore passed on the governorship to him over his sons with Mi Zhu leading the local families to his meeting, Mi Zhu thereafter rendered his service to Liu Bei. In 196, while Liu Bei was leading an army to resist Yuan Shu's advance, Lü Bu betrayed him and seized control of Xiapi, the capital of Xu Province, and proclaimed himself the governor. Henceforth, Liu Bei was forced into exile, forming a series of temporary alliances with different warlords, including Cao Cao, Yuan Shao and Liu Biao. Throughout this trough in Liu Bei's career, however, Mi Zhu stayed loyal. 

Previously, when Liu Bei learned of Lu Bu's betrayal, he tried to lead his army back to Xiapi however the majority of his soldiers deserted along the way, furthermore surrounded by the forces of both Lu Bu and Yuan Shu in now hostile territory, there were reported acts of cannibalism among Liu Bei's troops. To restore some stability among the army, Mi Zhu sponsored Liu Bei with his all of his family wealth and also married his younger sister to the latter. Cao Cao had once attempted to entice Mi Zhu and Mi Fang to serve him by offering them governorships of Ying Commandery (northwest of present-day Laiwu, Shandong) and Pengcheng Commandery respectively but was turned down, and the brothers fled with Liu Bei.

The Cáo Gōng Jí records one of Cao Cao's memorials concerning Mi Zhu :

When Liu Bei sought refuge with Liu Biao, he sent Mi Zhu first to meet and discuss with him. And for his effort in soothing the relation between them was appointed as General of the Left's Attending Official Internal Cadet. After Liu Bei conquered Yi Province (covering present-day Sichuan and Chongqing) in 214, Mi Zhu was promoted to General Who Pacifies Han. Although Mi Zhu was known for his kindness and his grace; he was not given any troops to command, as military manoeuver were not his expertise, he was nonetheless the most highly esteemed among Liu Bei's subjects. He was viewed as a role model official for the state of Shu and many young civil officials looked up to him as they did to Zhuge Liang, Fa Zheng, Dong He and Xu Jing.

In 219, Mi Fang defected to Sun Quan when Sun's general Lü Meng launched a surprise attack on Jing Province (covering present-day Hubei and Hunan), which resulted in the death of Guan Yu. When he heard of this, Mi Zhu bound himself and came to Liu Bei, pleading guilty for his brother's crime. Liu Bei consoled him and told him that the fault of a brother shouldn't reach another and treated him the same as before however Mi Zhu was so ashamed that he soon fell sick and died slightly more than a year later.

Family
Aside from his younger brother and sister, Mi Zhu had a son Mi Wei (麋威) who reached the rank of Tiger Elite Internal Cadet General while Wei's son Mi Zhào (麋照) was Tiger Cavalry Supervisor. The Mi family were known to be talented with the arts of archery and riding hence they were all excellent riders and archers.

Appraisal
Chen Shou, who wrote Mi Zhu's biography, commented as follows: "Mi Zhu, Sun Qian, Jian Yong and Yi Ji were refined and cultured persons whose ideas were widely circulated. They were well known for their good observation of the proprieties."

See also
 Lists of people of the Three Kingdoms

Notes

  麋竺 is often (mis)printed as 糜竺 in copies of the historical novel Romance of the Three Kingdoms in circulation.

References

 Chen, Shou (3rd century). Records of the Three Kingdoms (Sanguozhi).
 Pei, Songzhi (5th century). Annotations to Records of the Three Kingdoms (Sanguozhi zhu).

221 deaths
2nd-century births
Generals under Liu Bei
Han dynasty generals from Jiangsu
Han dynasty politicians from Jiangsu
Officials under Liu Bei
Political office-holders in Shandong
Politicians from Lianyungang
Tao Qian and associates